Nadir Shukurov (born February 28, 1967) is an Azerbaijani former footballer.

During his career he played for Azerbaijani sides Baku, Qarabağ, MKT Araz, Gabala and Karvan. During his time with Karvan, on 19 April 2009, Shukurov became the oldest player to play in the Azerbaijan Premier League. Shukurov had initially retired at the end of the 2007–08 season, but had retained his playing registration in case he was called upon. Due to Karvan's injury problems at the time, he stepped in helped halt a seven-game losing streak in their 3-1 victory over Mughan.

Career statistics

National team statistics

References

External links 
 

Azerbaijani footballers
Azerbaijan international footballers
1967 births
Living people
Gabala FC players
FK MKT Araz players
Association football goalkeepers